Saint-Laurent-en-Royans is a commune in the Drôme department in southeastern France. It is situated to the north of Saint-Jean-en-Royans, and to the west of Combe Laval.

Population

See also
Communes of the Drôme department
Parc naturel régional du Vercors

References

Communes of Drôme